Steve Christiansen can refer to:

 Steve Christiansen
 Steve Christiansen (rower)